Mohamed Hamada Barakate (born 22 February 1988 in Casablanca) is a Moroccan  footballer who plays as a defender for the Kuwaiti Premier League side Kazma.

Biography 

He Joined Wydad Casablanca at age 11 years old, and won the Junior Championship. He joined the  under 18 national team for Morocco in 2006, and  two years later he started his first professional match.

Honours 

Wydad Casablanca
 Botola: 2010

External links

References 

Wydad AC players
1988 births
Living people
Association football defenders
Kazma SC players
Kuwait Premier League players
Expatriate footballers in Kuwait
Moroccan expatriate sportspeople in Kuwait
Hassania Agadir players
MC Oujda players
Botola players
Moroccan footballers